Cannon Hill Park is a park located in south Birmingham, England. It is the most popular park in the city, covering  consisting of formal, conservation, woodland and sports areas. Recreational activities at the park include boating, fishing, bowls, tennis, putting and picnic areas.

It also contains Birmingham Wildlife Conservation Park, the mac theatre, and adjacent to the park is Edgbaston Cricket Ground.

History

J.T Gibson of Battersea was employed to transform the site. He constructed two large lakes, the smaller ornamental ponds and a bathing pool. 35 acres were devoted to ornamental gardens and shrub borders. Kew Gardens donated seeds and plants to establish the collection, this collection was used by students to enable them to study botany. It opened to the public in September 1873. A further  were given by the brewer John Holder in 1897, and in 1898  were acquired to straighten the River Rea, which is now culverted and runs along the western edge.

Features 

A 1906 granite and bronze memorial to the dead of the Second Boer War by Albert Toft, stands on the western edge of the park. Grade II* listed, it was refurbished in 2012.

In 1911 a 16th-century timbered house was moved from Deritend and re-erected in the park by the Birmingham Archaeological Society, to serve as a refreshment room and cricket pavilion. Named the Golden Lion Inn it is a Grade II listed building but is now in a very poor state of repair and fenced-off. The bandstand, the bridge over the lake ('Red Carriage Bridge'), and Cannon Hill House are also Grade II Listed.

Another memorial, unveiled on 27 July 1924, commemorates Scouts who fell in the First and (by later inscription) Second World Wars. It is in concrete, and was designed by the architect William Haywood.

A scale model of the Elan Valley Reservoirs, in the form of ornamental ponds, is located in a Japanese garden near the mac. It was built in the 1960s.

On 4 March 2019, a memorial to the British victim of the 2015 Bardo National Museum attack, and 30 British victims of the 2015 Sousse attacks, in Tunisia, was unveiled by Prince Harry, Duke of Sussex. The memorial is called Infinite Wave.

Events

A free 5 kilometre parkrun running event is held in the park every Saturday morning at 9am and usually attracts over 750 runners each week. A free 2 kilometre junior parkrun event for children aged between 4 and 14 takes place at 9am on Sunday mornings.

The Great Birmingham 10k and Great Birmingham Run half-marathon events also pass through the park.

References

External links

 Birmingham City Council - Cannon Hill Park 

Grade II listed buildings in Birmingham
Parks and open spaces in Birmingham, West Midlands
1873 establishments in England